Parodi  is a panchayat village in the state of Maharashtra, India, on the left (north) bank of the Bhima River.  Administratively, Parodi is under Shirur Taluka of Pune District in Maharashtra. There is only the single village of Parodi in the Parodi gram panchayat.  The village of Parodi is 12.5 km by road east of the village of Talegaon Dhamdhere, and 32 km by road southwest of the town of Shirur.

Demographics 
In the 2001 census, the village of Parodi had 1,114 inhabitants, with 569 males (51.1%) and 545 females (48.9%), for a gender ratio of 958 females per thousand males.

Notes

External links 
 
 

Villages in Pune district